Citrullinated protein may refer to:
Any protein having undergone citrullination
The proteins (often cyclic ones) being the targets of anti-citrullinated protein antibodies